Innovation Quarter in Winston-Salem, North Carolina, formerly Wake Forest Innovation Quarter, is an innovation district focused on research, business and education in biomedical science, information technology, digital media, clinical services and advanced materials. The Innovation Quarter, operated by Wake Forest Baptist Medical Center, is home to academic groups, private companies and other organizations located on 330 acres in downtown Winston-Salem. Its tenants include departments from five academic institutions—Wake Forest School of Medicine, Wake Forest University, Forsyth Technical Community College, Winston-Salem State University, UNC School of the Arts— as well as private businesses and other organizations. One tenant is the Wake Forest Institute for Regenerative Medicine (WFIRM), which is working to engineer more than 30 different replacement tissues and organs and to develop healing cell therapies. The science and research conducted at WFIRM is behind two start-up companies at Innovation Quarter. The ability of researchers and scientists to work alongside entrepreneurs furthers a goal of Innovation Quarter to develop new treatments and cures for disease and advances in technology.

History and Growth

The idea of a research park in Winston-Salem was a community-wide effort that began in the early 1990s in the wake of R. J. Reynolds Tobacco Company closing many of its former downtown warehouse and manufacturing buildings. Wake Forest School of Medicine's Department of Physiology and Pharmacology moved into one former Reynolds warehouse in 1993, along with eight researchers from Winston-Salem State University. Civic committees and discussion led to a master plan being announced in 2002 for what was then called Piedmont Triad Research Park.

On August 27, 1998, a former Reynolds factory building burned in one of the city's worst fires ever. JDL Castle Corp. was renovating Building 256-2 and several other buildings for the research park.

The first new building, One Technology Place, opened in 2000, occupied by Targacept Inc., a biopharmaceutical company that was spun out of R.J. Reynolds Tobacco. The company developed drugs to treat nervous system diseases and disorders.

On April 7, 2000, developer David Shannon announced plans for a three-story building on the site of Building 256-2, and in a style recalling that building, which would house the medical school's Physician Assistant program.

Biotech Place opened in February 2012. The 242,000-square-foot structure is composed of two former Reynolds warehouses that have been renovated into a modern biotech research facility, with custom-designed wet and labs as well as Class A office space. The $100 million project was Winston-Salem's most expensive ever downtown project; it houses Wake Forest School of Medicine's departments of Physiology and Pharmacology, Biomedical Engineering, and Immunology and Microbiology, as well as the Childress Institute for Pediatric Trauma. Private businesses—Carolina Liquid Chemistries, Allegacy Federal Credit Union, Brioche Doree cafe—also are tenants at Biotech Place.
Piedmont Triad Research Park was renamed in March 2013 as Wake Forest Innovation Quarter in recognition of the shift from biotechnology to a mix of biomedical and material sciences, information technology, and other health and communications fields.

Early 2014 saw Inmar Inc., an information technology company, move into another renovated former R.J. Reynolds building in the Innovation Quarter. Inmar relocated 900 employees from other sites in Winston-Salem to its new, state-of-the-art headquarters. The company also announced a partnership with the Division of Public Health Sciences of Wake Forest School of Medicine in which Inmar's digital analytics will be used to help locate and enroll patients for clinical trials conducted by the school. The Division of Public Health Sciences in early 2015 completed a move into the Innovation Quarter, in a building called 525@vine adjacent to Inmar's headquarters. The 525@vine building, a five-story R.J. Reynolds factory built in 1926 and renovated in 2012-13, also houses the School of Medicine's Physician Assistant program, as well as Forsyth Technical Community College’s Emerging Technologies Center, which trains more than 1,200 students annually.

Also in 2014, work began on 1.6-acre Bailey Park at Fourth Street and Patterson Avenue. The park was intended to be a space for events such as concerts. 

In 2020, the Innovation Quarter announced that it was simplifying its name in order to better reflect the diversity of companies, peoples and institutions located in the innovation district.

A master plan for the 28-acre Phase II, former site of the city bus station and a location once considered for a soccer stadium, was presented June 14, 2021. Unlike previous development, this area would not include renovated historic buildings, since there were none in the area. About 1 million square feet of clinical, laboratory and office space would be added to the 2.1 million square feet already developed. The plan called for as many as 450 residential units and 30,000 square feet of retail and restaurants. 15 acres would become green space. Fogle Commons would be a space for entertainment and events.

Public-Private Collaboration

With state and federal funding, and the cooperation of neighboring communities, Innovation Quarter's expansion plan includes private businesses, retail and residential units. Among the work is relocating Norfolk Southern Railroad lines, construction of a new rail bridge and burying Duke Energy transmission lines. More than $17 million from the City of Winston-Salem and Forsyth County, have helped leverage $350 million in state, federal and private investment at Innovation Quarter.

Wake Forest Innovations

The renaming of Piedmont Triad Research Park to Wake Forest Innovation Quarter came shortly after Wake Forest Baptist Medical Center created a new operating division, Wake Forest Innovations, to establish and manage new business, partnerships, licenses and start-up companies based on the discoveries, intellectual property and research assets of the medical center and Wake Forest University.

Wake Forest Innovations has separate units that market its scientific business assets-core laboratories, preclinical translational services, for example-to outside partners, while also promoting discovery and innovation and the licensing of technologies.

References

External links 

https://www.innovationquarter.com/

Science parks in the United States
High-technology business districts in the United States
Buildings and structures in Winston-Salem, North Carolina
Economy of Winston-Salem, North Carolina